Gesta Danorum ("Deeds of the Danes") is a patriotic work of Danish history, by the 12th-century author Saxo Grammaticus ("Saxo the Literate", literally "the Grammarian"). It is the most ambitious literary undertaking of medieval Denmark and is an essential source for the nation's early history. It is also one of the oldest known written documents about the history of Estonia and Latvia.

Consisting of sixteen books written in Latin on the invitation of Archbishop Absalon, Gesta Danorum describes Danish history and to some degree Scandinavian history in general, from prehistory to the late 12th century. In addition, Gesta Danorum offers singular reflections on European affairs in the High Middle Ages from a unique Scandinavian perspective, supplementing what has been handed down by historians from Western and Southern Europe.

Books 
The sixteen books, in prose with an occasional excursion into poetry, can be categorized into two parts: Books 1–9, which deal with Norse mythology and semi-legendary Danish history, and Books 10–16, which deal with medieval history. Book 9 ends with Gorm the Old. The last three books (14–16), which describe Danish conquests on the south shore of the Baltic Sea and wars against Slavic peoples (the Northern Crusades), are very valuable for the history of West Slavic tribes (Polabian Slavs, Pomeranians) and Slavic paganism. Book 14 contains a unique description of the temple on the island of Rügen.

Overview

Book 1 
The first book is mostly Saxo's original work, sharing little with other primary works, but taking some inspiration from Ancient Greek epics. It very briefly covers the rule of the eponymous founder of the Danish nation, Dan, but also his sons Humble and Lother, and Dan's grandson, Skiold, whose son, Gram is the first Danish king to be given some detail, his reign revolves around conquering Sweden and Finland, only to die in a battle. Most of the book deals with the adventures of Hading, the son of Gram and Finnish princess, Signe. Here the adventure concerns the loss of Denmark to the Swedes as well as Hading's attempts to reclaim it with the help of giants and Odin. The book concludes with Hading's suicide after hearing of his friend's death.

Book 2 
Follows adventurers of Hading's descendants, who perform cunning raids across the Baltic Sea and far as England, while encountering many supernatural events and being forced to solve disputes via single combat.

Book 3 

Introduces Amleth as a grandson of a Danish king, whose father was murdered by his uncle, the governor of Jylland. Amleth pretends to be a fool in fear of his uncle who has married his mother.

Book 4 
Deals with Amleth securing his place as the king of the Danes, and return to Britain where he ends up marrying a Britanian princess, whose father plots the demise of Amleth, and the queen of Scotland who is famous for murdering all her suitors.

Book 5 
Focused on empire-building of Frotho III and his brilliant Norwegian advisor, Erick the Eloquent. Ultimately Frotho ends up ruling over Britain, Scandinavia, the Slavs, and the Huns. Saxo makes many parallels to Augustus.

Book 6 
Follows the adventurers of the legendary hero, Starkad who is disappointed in the decadent ways of Frothi III's descendants.

Book 7 
Is a collection of short and unrelated love stories, many of these ventures feature shieldmaidens.

Book 8 
Covers the famous Battle of Brávellir, between Harald Wartooth and Sigurd Ring. Danish involvement in the Saxon wars against Charlemagne,  voyages to Biarmia, and the death of Starkad.

Book 9 
The book deals with Ragnar Lothbrok and his rising empire, he appoints many of his sons to govern parts of his empire all the way from Scotland to Scythia.

History

Chronology 
When exactly Gesta Danorum was written is the subject of numerous works; however, it is generally agreed that Gesta Danorum was not finished before 1208. The last event described in the last book (Book 16) is King Canute VI of Denmark subduing Pomerania under Duke Bogislaw I, in 1186. However the preface of the work, dedicated to Archbishop Anders Sunesen, mentions the Danish conquest of the areas north of the Elbe in 1208.

Book 14, comprising nearly one-quarter of the text of the entire work, ends with Absalon's appointment to archbishop in 1178. Since this book is so large and Absalon has greater importance than King Valdemar I, this book may have been written first and comprised a work on its own. It is possible that Saxo then enlarged it with Books 15 and 16, telling the story of King Valdemar I's last years and King Canute VI's first years.

It is believed that Saxo then wrote Books 11, 12, and 13. Svend Aagesen's history of Denmark, Brevis Historia Regum Dacie (circa 1186), states that Saxo had decided to write about "The king-father and his sons," which would be King Sweyn Estridson, in Books 11, 12, and 13. He would later add the first ten books. This would also explain the 22 years between the last event described in the last book (Book 16) and the 1208 event described in the preface.

Manuscripts 
The original manuscripts of the work are lost, except for four fragments: the Angers Fragment, Lassen Fragment, Kall-Rasmussen Fragment and Plesner Fragment. The Angers Fragment is the biggest fragment, and the only one attested to be in Saxo’s own handwriting. The other ones are copies from ca. 1275. All four fragments are in the collection of the Danish Royal Library in Copenhagen, Denmark.

The text has, however, survived. In 1510–1512, Christiern Pedersen, a Danish translator working in Paris, searched Denmark high and low for an existing copy of Saxo’s works, which by that time was nearly all but lost. By that time most knowledge of Saxo’s work came from a summary located in Chronica Jutensis, from around 1342, called Compendium Saxonis. It is also in this summary that the name Gesta Danorum is found. The title Saxo himself used for his work is unknown.

Christiern Pedersen finally found a copy in the collection of Archbishop Birger Gunnersen of Lund, Skåne (Skåne is now part of Sweden, but at the time was still part of Denmark), which he gladly lent him. With the help of printer Jodocus Badius, Gesta Danorum was refined and printed.

Printing 

The first printed press publication and the oldest known complete text of Saxo’s works is Christiern Pedersen's Latin edition, printed and published by Jodocus Badius in Paris, France, on 15 March 1514 under the title of Danorum Regum heroumque Historiae ("History of the Kings and heroes of the Danes"). The edition features the following colophon: ...impressit in inclyta Parrhisorum academia Iodocus Badius Ascensius Idibus Martiis. MDXIIII. Supputatione Romana. (the Ides of March, 1514).

The full front page reads (with abbreviations expanded) in Latin:
Danorum Regum heroumque Historiae stilo eleganti a Saxone Grammatico natione Zialandico necnon Roskildensis ecclesiae praeposito, abhinc supra trecentos annos conscriptae et nunc primum literaria serie illustratae tersissimeque impressae.

English language:
Histories of the Kings and heroes of the Danes, composed in elegant style by Saxo Grammaticus, a Zealander and also provost of the church of Roskilde, over three hundred years ago, and now for the first time illustrated and printed correctly in a learned compilation.

Latin versions 
The source of all existing translations and new editions is Christiern Pedersen's Latin Danorum Regum heroumque Historiae. There exist a number of different translations today, some complete, some partial:

Danish translations 
 Christiern Pedersen, never published ca. 1540, Lost
 Jon Tursons, lost, never published ca. 1555
 
 
 
 
 
  , 2 volumes

English translations 
 
 
 
 
  ,  Volume 1 includes books I-X and Volume 2 includes books XI-XVI.

Other translations 
 
 
 
 
  [Full translation on Russian by Andrey Dosaev in two vols.]

Gesta Danorum is also translated partially in other English, French and German releases.

Hamlet 

Certain aspects of Gesta Danorum formed the basis for William Shakespeare's play Hamlet. It is thought that Shakespeare never read Gesta Danorum, and instead had access to an auxiliary version of the tale describing the downfall of Amleth, Prince of Denmark.

Saxo's version, told of in Books 3 and 4, is very similar to that of Shakespeare's Hamlet. In Saxo's version, two brothers, Orvendil and Fengi are given the rule over Jutland by King Rørik Slyngebond of the Danes.  Soon after, Orvendil marries King Rørik's daughter, Geruth (Gertrude in Hamlet). Amleth is their first and only child.

Fengi becomes resentful of his brother's marriage, and also wants sole leadership of Jutland, so therefore murders Orvendil. After a very brief period of mourning, Fengi marries Geruth, and declares himself sole leader of Jutland. Eventually, Amleth avenges his father's murder and plans the murder of his uncle, making him the new and rightful King of Jutland. However, while Hamlet dies in Shakespeare's version just after his uncle's death, in Saxo's version Amleth survives and begins ruling his kingdom, going on to other adventures.

References

Sources

  
  
  ,  (table of contents in Danish).

External links 

 

12th-century history books
12th-century Latin books
Sources of Norse mythology
Sources on Germanic paganism
Danish chronicles
Danish non-fiction books
12th century in Denmark
Cultural depictions of Ragnar Lodbrok